Aghuzlu (also Romanized as Āghūzlū and Aghooz Loo; also known as Āqowzlū and Auqūzlu) is a village in Zarrineh Rud Rural District, Bizineh Rud District, Khodabandeh County, Zanjan Province, Iran. At the 2006 census, its population was 627, in 139 families.

References 

Populated places in Khodabandeh County